IROC VIII was the eighth year of IROC competition, which took place in 1984. It saw the use of the Chevrolet  Camaro in all races, and was the first incarnation of the IROC format in which twelve drivers from different series compete in all four races. Races one and four took place at Michigan International Speedway, while race two took place at Burke Lakefront Airport, and race three ran on the Talladega Superspeedway. Cale Yarborough won one race en route to the championship and $150,000.

This season was the first of three straight that television coverage was on CBS.

The roster of drivers and final points standings were as follows:

Race results

Race One, Michigan International Speedway
Saturday, June 16, 1984

(5) Indicates 5 bonus points added to normal race points scored for leading the most laps.(3) Indicates 3 bonus points added to normal race points scored for leading the 2nd most laps(2) Indicates 2 bonus points added to normal race points scored for leading the 3rd most laps.

Average speed: Cautions: n/aMargin of victory: 3 clLead changes: 9

Race Two, Burke Lakefront Airport
Saturday, July 7, 1984

(5) Indicates 5 bonus points added to normal race points scored for leading the most laps.(3) Indicates 3 bonus points added to normal race points scored for leading the 2nd most laps(2) Indicates 2 bonus points added to normal race points scored for leading the 3rd most laps (did not occur in this race so not awarded).

Average speed: Cautions: n/aMargin of victory: 8 secLead changes: 2

Race Three, Talladega Superspeedway
Saturday, July 28, 1984

(5) Indicates 5 bonus points added to normal race points scored for leading the most laps.(3) Indicates 3 bonus points added to normal race points scored for leading the 2nd most laps(2) Indicates 2 bonus points added to normal race points scored for leading the 3rd most laps.

Average speed: Cautions: 1 (Lap 1, Neil Bonnett & Derek Bell accident)Margin of victory: 8 inchesLead changes: 4

Race Four, Michigan International Speedway
Saturday, August 11, 1984 

(5) Indicates 5 bonus points added to normal race points scored for leading the most laps.(3) Indicates 3 bonus points added to normal race points scored for leading the 2nd most laps(2) Indicates 2 bonus points added to normal race points scored for leading the 3rd most laps (did not occur in this race so not awarded).

Average speed: Cautions: n/aMargin of victory: 3 feetLead changes: 2

References

External links
IROC VIII History - IROC Website

International Race of Champions
1984 in American motorsport